Jeffrey Scot Suppan (born January 2, 1975), is an American former professional baseball pitcher and current professional baseball coach who played 17 seasons in Major League Baseball (MLB). He played for the Boston Red Sox, Arizona Diamondbacks, Kansas City Royals, Pittsburgh Pirates, St. Louis Cardinals, Milwaukee Brewers and San Diego Padres.

Early life
Suppan pitched at Crespi Carmelite High School in California's San Fernando Valley. He pitched one no-hitter as a freshman and another as a senior against Harvard-Westlake School in the midst of a 42-inning scoreless streak. Suppan also played first base and hit .480 with a .950 slugging percentage as a senior. As a pitcher, he had a 0.73 WHIP, a 0.92 earned run average and a 9.07 strikeout-to-walk ratio. The Los Angeles Times named him their 1993 San Fernando Valley Player of the Year.

Suppan committed to play college baseball at UCLA over offers from USC, Nevada, Cal and Cal State Long Beach. He was selected by the Boston Red Sox with the 49th pick of the 1993 Major League Baseball draft and signed for $190,000.

Professional career

Boston Red Sox
He played with the Red Sox through the 1997 season. In his first three seasons, Suppan compiled a 9–6 record, his 1997 season marked his only season in Boston in which he made more than 10 starts. Although his record was 7–3 in 1997, his ERA was 5.69 in 22 starts.

Arizona Diamondbacks
Suppan was picked up by the expansion Arizona Diamondbacks in 1998. In his lone season with Arizona, Suppan was 1–7 in 13 starts with a 6.68 ERA.

Kansas City Royals
Late in the 1998 season, he was traded to the Kansas City Royals. Suppan was a mainstay for the Royals rotation, averaging 33 starts and 10 wins through his 4 seasons with the team. From 1999 to 2001, Suppan won 10 games in each season. In 2002, Suppan suffered his worst season as a Royal, going 9–16 in 33 starts.

Pittsburgh Pirates
In 2003, he opened the season for the Pittsburgh Pirates after signing a one-year deal with them in January. Through 21 starts, Suppan was 10–7 with a 3.57 ERA for the Pirates.

Second Stint with Boston
Suppan was dealt at the trading deadline back to the Red Sox for their playoff stretch run. Suppan did not perform well during Boston's stretch run. He went 3–4 with a 5.57 ERA and surrendering 12 home runs.

St. Louis Cardinals
The Cardinals signed Suppan as a free agent in 2004, and he embarked upon a career year, posting a 16–9 record and a 4.16 earned run average, with 110 strikeouts, 65 walks, and 192 hits allowed in 188 innings. Suppan helped lead the Cards to the 2004 World Series, where he started Game 3. His baserunning blunder in Game 3 was one of the defining moments of the Series.

In 2005, he improved on his previous year's performance, going 16–10 with a 3.57 ERA. He started Game 4 of the National League Championship series against the Houston Astros, allowing one run over five innings but came away with a no-decision after the Astros took the lead later in the game.

Suppan has hit two career Major League home runs, both off Steve Trachsel of the New York Mets. His first was on September 10, 2005. The Cardinals won the game 4–2. He hit his second in Game 3 of the 2006 National League Championship Series. The Cardinals would win the game 5–0 to take a 2–1 lead in the series.

Suppan started Game 7 of the 2006 NLCS against the New York Mets. He did not factor in the decision, giving up only one run in seven innings, but the Cardinals won 3–1, earning him the National League Championship Series MVP. Suppan in the 2006 NLCS had a 0.60 ERA in 15 innings pitched.

Milwaukee Brewers
During the 2006 offseason Suppan signed a four-year, $42 million contract with the Milwaukee Brewers.

Initial excitement in Milwaukee quickly waned as Suppan's performance declined over time. From 2007 to 2009, his walk rate, home runs allowed, and ERA climbed while his strikeouts declined.  While pitching in Milwaukee fans began an odd practice of wearing paper bags over their heads and throwing soup cans on to the field during Suppan's starts.  Between 1995 and 2006, Suppan held a career ERA of 1.76 at Miller Park, where he was to pitch for the Brewers in 2007. Suppan is one of only 8 ballplayers who pitched in the NL in 2007 who won at least 12 games in each year from 2004 to 2007, the others being Carlos Zambrano, Greg Maddux, Roy Oswalt, Tim Hudson, Derek Lowe, Jason Marquis and Johan Santana.

Suppan, along with teammates J. J. Hardy, Bill Hall, and Chris Capuano appeared in an episode of The Young and the Restless which aired on CBS on June 20, 2007. On June 7, 2008, Suppan was placed on the 15-day disabled list, his first DL stint since 1996. After being sent to the bullpen, Suppan's run with Milwaukee ended after 15 appearances. On June 7, 2010, the Brewers released Suppan.

Second Stint with St. Louis
He signed with the St. Louis Cardinals on June 14, 2010.

San Francisco Giants
On January 25, 2011, the San Francisco Giants signed Suppan to a minor league deal. On March 29, the Giants released Suppan.

Second Stint with Kansas City
On April 4, 2011, the Kansas City Royals signed Suppan to a minor league deal. He remained the entire season in Omaha.

San Diego Padres

He signed a minor league contract with the San Diego Padres on February 8, 2012. After a rash of injuries to the Padres rotation, Suppan was called up to the majors. He made his first start on May 2, 2012. It was his first time making a start since the 2010 season. Suppan opted for free agency over a minor league assignment with the Padres on June 5, 2012, according to the Padres' official website.

Retirement
Suppan announced his retirement as a player on January 2, 2014, his 39th birthday. The announcement was timed for 2 p.m. PST, to honor his mother, Kathleen Suppan, who died six years earlier on the same day and at the same time.

Suppan was the pitching coach for the Idaho Falls Chukars of the Pioneer League. The Chukars were the Rookie-Advanced affiliate of Suppan's former team, the Kansas City Royals. In 2019, Suppan left the Chukars to become a roving minor league co-ordinator for the Royals organization.

Pitching style
As with many older pitchers, Suppan relies comparatively little on pitch speed to get outs. He is a finesse pitcher, using a variety of pitches with good movement to create weak contact for hitters. His expansive pitch repertoire includes a four-seam fastball and sinker in the mid-upper 80s, a cut fastball in the low-mid 80s, a changeup around 80, a big curveball at 70 and a slider in the upper 70s.

Restaurant
Suppan, whose nickname is "Soup," is also a restaurateur. His restaurant, Soup's Grill, is jointly operated with his wife. It is located in Woodland Hills, California. Soup's Grill closed in January 2016 to devote his time to being pitching coach for the Idaho Falls Chukars.

Religion and activism
Suppan is a devout Roman Catholic, appearing in the DVD Champions Of Faith and in Rosary Stars Praying the Gospel. He has spoken to the National Catholic Register about his faith.

He appeared in a political advertisement alongside Patricia Heaton, Jim Caviezel, Mike Sweeney, and Kurt Warner, among others, during the 2006 World Series. The advertisement aired in opposition to Missouri Constitutional Amendment 2 (2006), which allows in Missouri any kind of embryonic stem cell research that is legal under federal law. The advertisement aired shortly after the airing of an earlier advertisement featuring actor Michael J. Fox The Fox advertisement had supported Amendment 2, as well as the campaign of United States Senate candidate Claire McCaskill. The Suppan advertisement did not explicitly mention the Senate race. The timing of both ads during a World Series that featured the St. Louis Cardinals was intended to draw the particular attention of Missouri voters.

Career highlights
2006 World Series Champion
2006 National League Championship Series MVP

See also

 List of people from Oklahoma City
 List of World Series starting pitchers
 St. Louis Cardinals award winners and league leaders

References

External links

1975 births
Living people
Baseball players from Oklahoma
Boston Red Sox players
Arizona Diamondbacks players
Kansas City Royals players
Pittsburgh Pirates players
St. Louis Cardinals players
Milwaukee Brewers players
San Diego Padres players
Sportspeople from Oklahoma City
Major League Baseball pitchers
American Roman Catholics
Gulf Coast Red Sox players
Sarasota Red Sox players
Trenton Thunder players
Pawtucket Red Sox players
Tucson Sidewinders players
Nashville Sounds players
Wisconsin Timber Rattlers players
Omaha Storm Chasers players
Tucson Padres players
National League Championship Series MVPs